Tolga-Os is a former municipality in the old Hedmark county, Norway. The  municipality existed from 1966 until 1976. It included all of the present-day municipalities of Tolga and Os. The administrative centre of the municipality was the village of Tolga.

History

Historically, the municipality of Tolga had always included Os until 1926 when Os had become the separate municipality of Os. During the 1960s, there were many municipal mergers across Norway due to the work of the Schei Committee. On 1 January 1966, the neighboring municipalities of Tolga (population: 1,944) and Os (population: 2,015) were merged to form the new municipality of Tolga-Os. Soon after the merger, there was discontent in the new municipality. On 10 April 1975, the government allowed the merger to be dissolved, so on 1 January 1976 Tolga (population: 1,865) and Os (population: 1,859) became separate municipalities once again using the pre-1966 borders.

Government

The municipal council  of Tolga-Os was made up of 25 representatives that were elected to four year terms.  The party breakdown of the final municipal council was as follows:

See also
List of former municipalities of Norway

References

Os, Innlandet
Tolga, Norway
Former municipalities of Norway
1966 establishments in Norway
1976 disestablishments in Norway